Cryptobranchia is a genus of true deep water limpets, marine gastropod mollusks in the family Lepetidae, true limpets.

This genus has become a synonym of Lepeta Gray, 1847.

Species
Species within the genus Cryptobranchia include:
 Cryptobranchia kuragiensis (Yokoyama, 1920) (still an accepted name by WoRMS)

References

External links 
 photo of shells of Cryptobranchia kuragiensis from:  Sasaki T., Matsubara T., Ito Y. & Amano K. (2008). "Illustrations of Cenozoic molluscan type specimens preserved in The University Museum, The University of Tokyo. Part 1. Four species of Patellogastropoda described as Acmaea". Chiribotan 39(1): 35-41.

Lepetidae
Taxa named by Alexander von Middendorff